The Census (Great Britain) Act 1900 (63 & 64 Vict. c.4), long title An Act for taking the Census for Great Britain in the year one thousand nine hundred and one, was an Act of Parliament of the Parliament of the United Kingdom, given the Royal Assent on 27 March 1900 and since repealed.

It laid down the methods for taking the United Kingdom Census 1901, providing that it would take place on Sunday the 31st of March and be administered by the Local Government Board. The information to be recorded was broadly the same as in previous years - the name, sex, age, occupation, marital status, birthplace, and nationality where appropriate, along with the relation to the head of the family, for every person staying in that house on the night of the census day. If any of these people were "blind or deaf and dumb, or imbecile or lunatic" this was to be recorded. 
Information was, as usual, also to be gathered from aboard ship, as well as in prisons, hospitals, workhouses, asylums, etc.

A limited amount of information on housing was also gathered; if the occupier lived in less than five rooms, they were to state the number of rooms occupied. In Scotland, the number of rooms in each dwelling which possessed windows, inclusive of the kitchen, was to be recorded.

The information was to be held by the Registrar General, who would compile a preliminary report within five months and a full report as soon as practicable.

The Act only applied in Great Britain - England, Scotland and Wales - with the Irish census provided for by a separate Act, the Census (Ireland) Act 1900. There were, however, some small differences in the way the census was to be handled in each. In Wales and Monmouth each person above the age of three was to state if they spoke Welsh or English, or a mixture of both. In Scotland, the relevant authorities were the Secretary of State for Scotland and the Registrar General for Scotland, and each person above the age of three was to state if they spoke Gaelic or English, or a mixture of both.

The Act was repealed in part by the Statute Law Revision Act 1908, with the residue repealed by the Statute Law Revision Act 1950.

References
The public general acts passed in the sixty-third and sixty-third and sixty-fourth years of the reign of her majesty Queen Victoria. London: printed for Her Majesty's Stationery Office. 1900.
Chronological table of the statutes; HMSO, London. 1993.

United Kingdom Acts of Parliament 1900
Repealed United Kingdom Acts of Parliament
Censuses in the United Kingdom
Acts of the Parliament of the United Kingdom concerning Great Britain